Kopylovo is a rural locality (a village) in Sizemskoye Rural Settlement, Sheksninsky District, Vologda Oblast, Russia. The population was 31 as of 2002.

Geography 
Kopylovo is located 65 km north of Sheksna (the district's administrative centre) by road. Malyino is the nearest rural locality.

References 

Rural localities in Sheksninsky District